Cheung Sha Wan Factory Estate was a factory estate in Cheung Sha Wan, Kowloon, Hong Kong, owned and managed by the Hong Kong Housing Authority. It comprised up to six low-storey blocks without lift service, built between 1957 and 1965.

Cheung Sha Wan Factory Estate was the first factory estate in Hong Kong built in Hong Kong by the Public Works Department. The six blocks of the estate were completed in October 1957 (Block 1), August 1960 (Block 1A), November 1960 (Block 2), September 1961 (Block 3), July 1965 (Block 4 and 5). Block 1 was demolished in 1990 due to structural problems.

Due to their outdated facilities, the five remaining blocks were cleared in 2002. The vacating of the estate was completed in April 2003, and it was demolished in 2006.

The part of the site west of Tonkin Street is now occupied by a public housing estate, Un Chau Estate Phase 5, completed in 2012. The part east of Tonkin Street is occupied by CCC Heep Woh Primary School (Cheung Sha Wan) and Sheng Kung Hui St. Thomas' Primary School.

See also
 Public factory estates in Hong Kong

References

External links

 Pictures of Cheung Sha Wan Factory Estate:      

1960 establishments in Hong Kong
Buildings and structures demolished in 2006
Cheung Sha Wan
Factory buildings in Hong Kong
Former buildings and structures in Hong Kong
2006 disestablishments in Hong Kong